Mildura Airport  is located  southwest of Mildura, Victoria, Australia. It is the busiest regional airport in Victoria, the 33rd busiest Australian airport and has twice been named Australia's Rural Airport of the Year.

History
During World War II it was taken over by the Royal Australian Air Force as RAAF Base Mildura. From 1961 to 1976, Australia and the United States Atomic Energy Commission agreed to conduct "Project HIBAL" Upper Atmosphere Sampling at Mildura Airport.

In 1967 the Airport was used to launch balloons for the French National Center for Scientific Research.

QantasLink de Havilland Dash 8 400 and Rex Airlines Saab 340 offer scheduled air services. Virgin Australia Boeing 737-800 began the first scheduled jet service from 13 October 2008 before the route was withdrawn in 2020. It is also home to Cobden Air and the Mildura Aero Club.

Its terminal facilities underwent renovation in September 2012, a $6.4 million revamp by builders Mossop Construction + Interiors. This was completed to modernise the airport, as well as increase its passenger handling capabilities to support future air travel growth.

In February 2022, new budget airline Bonza announced they would commence flights to Mildura, from Melbourne and the Sunshine Coast. The airline will to fly to Melbourne three times per week and to the Sunshine Coast two times per week.

Airlines and destinations

Operations

Statistics

Accidents and incidents
On 18 June 2013, a Virgin Australia Boeing 737-800 operating a flight from Brisbane to Adelaide with 91 passengers and crew on board diverted to Mildura due to heavy fog which had closed Adelaide airport. The flight carried enough fuel to allow roughly 30 minutes holding. A Qantas 737 had also diverted to Mildura, arriving after the Virgin flight and radioed that they were running low on fuel. This was interpreted by the Virgin crew as an urgent situation and they allowed the Qantas flight to land ahead. With the airport's automated weather service unavailable and the visibility deteriorating, the Virgin flight conducted a missed approach and now critically low on fuel were forced to commit to an immediate emergency landing. Mildura airport is not equipped with an Instrument Landing System approach aid and the crew performed the landing without visual reference to the runway on the second attempt. The aircraft landed with  remaining fuel.
On 6 November 2015, the pilot of a Cessna 310R, on a private flight from Moorabbin, lost control and crashed on approach to land at Mildura, after the left engine was starved of fuel. The pilot was fatally injured and the aircraft destroyed.

See also
 List of airports in Victoria

References

External links

Airports in Victoria (Australia)
Mildura